Tostado is a city in the northwest of the province of Santa Fe, Argentina,  north-west from the provincial capital.

The town was founded in 1891 and attained the status of comuna (commune) on 8 August 1904. It became a city on 31 December 1970.

References
 
 

Populated places in Santa Fe Province